LDOS may refer to:

 Local density of states, a physical quantity
 The ICAO code for Osijek Airport in Osijek, Croatia
 Lord's Day Observance Society
 The disk operating system for the TRS-80 that later replaced TRSDOS

See also 
DOS (disambiguation)
LOS (disambiguation)